The Delhi alcohol poisonings killed 199 people in Delhi on 5 November 1991 when they consumed illicit liquor. Most of them were casual labourers and rickshaw-pullers who died after consuming Karpoor Asav or sura, a so-called ayurvedic medicine. This 'Karpoor Asav' was manufactured by a firm called Karnal Pharmacy based in Ghaziabad in Uttar Pradesh. Tests confirmed that this 'Karpoor Asav' contained methyl alcohol. The Delhi Administration set up a one-Man Commission of Inquiry under the Chairmanship of Jagdish Chandra, a retired Judge of the Delhi High Court under the Commission of Inquiry Act. 1952.

See also 
List of alcohol poisonings in India

References

Crime in Delhi
1991 crimes in India
Alcohol-related deaths in India
Disasters in Delhi
1990s in Delhi